Jean-Marie Adé Adiaffi or Jean-Marie Adiaffi (1 January 1941 – 15 November 1999) was a writer, screenwriter, filmmaker and Ivorian critic. He studied film at Institut des hautes études cinématographiques (IDHEC) and philosophy at the Sorbonne, before teaching in his home country. He published his first collection of poems, "Yalé Sonan" in 1969. His novel "La carte d'identité" (The identity card, 1980), reflection on African postcolonial cultural alienation, receives the Grand prix littéraire d'Afrique noire. Next, came "D'éclairs et de foudre" (lightning and thunder, 1980) and "La Galerie infernale" (1984), "Silence, on développe" (1992). Committed in the modernization of African religions, he is the creator of "Bossonisme", a neologism designating a genius which is worshiped.

Biography 
Jean-Marie Ade Adiaffi was born on 1 January 1941 at Bettie in the region of Abengourou. Having lost his parents early on he was raised by Augustin Adépra, his maternal uncle. He completed his primary education at the village, his secondary school in Bingerville, then emigrated to France where he graduated. Adiaffi enrolled at `IDHEC (Advanced Institute of Film Studies) and then did an internship at the` OCORA (Office of Radio) from whence it comes out as a director of television and film.

Returned to Abidjan to work for RTI, the state broadcaster of Ivory Coast, he does not approve the conditions in the structure and returned to France in 1966 to prepare a Master of Philosophy at the Sorbonne. He obtained his CAPES and came back again in Ivory Coast in 1970 to teach philosophy in various schools and colleges including the Lycée classique d'Abidjan.

In addition, he is co-founder in 1986 of Association des écrivains de Côte d’Ivoire (the association of writers from Côte d'Ivoire).

Adiaffi began his literary creation in 1969 by the publication of Yale Sonan, and after more than a decade of silence, he resumed his production in 1980 by publishing d’éclairs et de foudres (lightning and thunder), a collection of poems. Then, he published other collections of poetry, but also several novels and an essay. Although, from a training of director of film and television, or of teacher of philosophy, Jean-Marie Adiaffi asserts himself especially in literature. And he is presented as `one of the most talented and innovative Ivorian writers.

The work of Jean-Marie Adiaffi is a product of multiple influences. It depends in particular of Présocratic authors, especially Parmenides and Heraclitus, of the Symbolists such that `Eluard, Rimbaud and Lautréamont, and of the authors of Negritude, particularly, Césaire. It also takes Agni culture.

Under the general title of "Assonan Attin" (The path of release), this literature focuses on a trilogy that is constituted by novel, poetry and drama. But only two axes were reached: In one hand, the novel, with "La carte d'identité", "Silence on développe", "Les naufragés de l`intelligence", and in the other hand, poetry, with "La galerie infernale" (The diabolical gallery) and "d`éclairs et de foudres" (lightning and thunder). "Yalé Sonan" and "La légende de l`éléphanteau", a children's story, published in 1983, are not a part of this trilogy.

Bossonism 
Jean-Marie Adiaffi is also the inventor of the concept of Bossonism – from "bosson" genius Agni – billed as "the religion of Africans."
For Adiaffi, colonization began with the spiritual (the `missionary activities), the release must be done by the spiritual way. "Bossonism", another name of "animism"- a term he`did not accept – appears as a theory of the revaluation of the "African spirituality". This concept is also, for Adiaffi, a "theology of African liberation."

Works

Novels 
 La carte d'identité – Hatier – 1980
 Silence, on développe – Nouvelles Du Sud – 1992
 Les naufragés de l'intelligence – CEDA – 2000

Poetry 
 Yale Sonan – Promotion et Edition – 1969
 D'éclairs et de foudres – CEDA – 1980
 Galerie infernale – CEDA – 1984

Essay 
 Lire Henri Konan Bédié, Le rêve de la graine – Neter – 1996

Children's book 
 La légende de l'éléphanteau – Editions de l'Amitié – 1983

Awards 
 Grand prix littéraire d'Afrique noire – 1981
 Chevalier du mérite culturel (Ivory Coast) – 1991

References 

Ivorian writers in French
1941 births
1999 deaths
Ivorian novelists
Ivorian male writers
Male novelists
People of French West Africa
Grand prix littéraire d'Afrique noire winners
University of Paris alumni
20th-century novelists
People from Abidjan
People from Comoé District
Ivorian poets
Male poets
20th-century poets
20th-century male writers
Ivorian expatriates in France